Robert Fitzgerald (March 14, 1923July 23, 1983) was an American professional basketball player.

A  center/forward from Seton Hall University, Fitzgerald played two seasons in the Basketball Association of America as a member of the Toronto Huskies, New York Knicks, and Rochester Royals. He was traded on January 21, 1947 by the Toronto Huskies to the New York Knicks for Bob Mullens. He averaged 3.1 points per game in his BAA career. 

Fitzgerald also played in the National Basketball League with the Rochester Royals and Syracuse Nationals.

Fitzgerald served in the military during World War II. His brother, Dick Fitzgerald, also played in the BAA, and the two were teammates while on the Toronto Huskies.

BAA career statistics

Regular season

Playoffs

References

External links

1923 births
1983 deaths
American expatriate basketball people in Canada
American men's basketball players
Basketball players from New York City
New York Knicks players
Rochester Royals players
Seton Hall Pirates men's basketball players
Shooting guards
Small forwards
Sportspeople from Queens, New York
Syracuse Nationals players
Toronto Huskies players